The following is a timeline of the history of the city of Guanajuato, Mexico.

Prior to 20th century

 1554 - Guanajuato founded.
 1558 - Mine shaft in operation, per Spaniards.
 1679 - Town charter granted.
 1732 - Hospice of the Holy Trinity founded.
 1741 - Guanajuato attains city status.
 1760 - Flood.
 1765 - Compania church built.
 1785 - Chamber of Commerce built.
 1788 - Templo de San Cayetano (church) dedicated.
 1809 - Alhóndiga de Granaditas built.
 1810 - Town besieged by forces of Miguel Hidalgo y Costilla.
 1812 - Mint established.
 1867 - National College of Guanajuato active.
 1872 - El Pensamiento Público newspaper in publication (approximate date).
 1895 - Population: 39,404.
 1898 - Plaza de la Paz built.
 1900
 Electricity installed (approximate date).
 Population: 41,486.

20th century

 1903 - Teatro Juarez (theatre) inaugurated.
 1911 - El Hearaldo Guanajuatense and El Triunfo de la Justicia newspapers begin publication.
 1960 - Population: 55,107.
 1972 - Festival Internacional Cervantino active.
 1990 - Population: 73,100.
 1998 - Expresión en Corto International Film Festival begins.

21st century

 2005 - Festival Medieval de Guanajuato begins.
 2007 - MM Cinemas open.
 2009
 Abejas de Guanajuato basketball team formed.
 Nicéforo Guerrero Reynoso elected mayor.
 2010 - Population: metro 171,709.
2021 - Location for Forza Horizon 5

See also
 Guanajuato history (city)
 Guanajuato history (state)

References

This article incorporates information from the Spanish Wikipedia.

Bibliography

in English
Published in the 19th century
 
 
 
 
 
 

Published in the 20th century
 
 
 
 
 
 
 
  (fulltext via OpenLibrary)
 
  (fulltext via OpenLibrary)
 
  (fulltext via OpenLibrary)

Published in the 21st century

in Spanish

External links

 Europeana. Items related to Guanajuato, Mexico, various dates.
 Digital Public Library of America. Items related to Guanajuato, Mexico, various dates

History of Guanajuato
Guanajuato
Guanajuato City